Ancula lentiginosa is a species of sea slug, a dorid nudibranch, a marine gastropod mollusc in the family Goniodorididae.

Distribution
This species was first described from La Jolla, California.

Description
This goniodorid nudibranch is translucent white in colour with brown patches or stripes composed of small brown spots interspersed with white pigment. The pre-rhinophoral papillae, rhinophore clubs and gills are similarly mottled with brown and there is a line of brown spots along the ridge of the tail. There are two extra-branchial papillae which are translucent white with a band of brown spots below the tip.

Ecology
Ancula lentiginosa feeds on Barentsia sp., Entoprocta which often grow on hydroids, bryozoa and other living substrata.

References

 Keen, A. M. 1971. Sea Shells of Tropical West America. Marine mollusks from Baja California to Peru, ed. 2. Stanford University Press. xv, 1064 pp., 22 pls.

Goniodorididae
Gastropods described in 1964